
Baysgarth School is a coeducational secondary school located in Barton-upon-Humber, North Lincolnshire, England.

The school was formed in 1975 from the merger of Barton Grammar School and Beretun Secondary Modern School, and is located over both former school sites.

Baysgarth is a community school administered by North Lincolnshire Council. Since 2006 the school has had a specialism in technology. School curriculum includes GCSEs, NVQs and ASDAN courses.

The school previously had a partnership with Brigg Sixth Form (which includes Sir John Nelthorpe School and The Vale Academy) to offer a wider range of sixth form courses over the three school sites. However Baysgarth School is no longer part of this consortium.

Notable former pupils
Peter D. Robinson, Presiding Bishop of the United Episcopal Church of North America
 Danielle Sharp (c2005-07)
Vanessa Winship, photographer

Barton Grammar School
Anthony John Clark, molecular biologist
Jamie Cann, Labour Party politician
Ted Lewis (writer), Crime Writer
Henry Treece, Poet (Taught at the school)

References

External links

Secondary schools in the Borough of North Lincolnshire
Community schools in the Borough of North Lincolnshire
Barton-upon-Humber